The National Labour Federation (NLF) is national trade union centre in Pakistan. The trade union is the labour wing of the Jamaat-e-Islami party and organises workers in various sectors, including telecommunications, shipyards, transport and manufacturing. It is the third-largest trade union in Pakistan and is not affiliated with any international labour organisations.

History
The trade union was formed on November 9, 1969, by Abul A'la Maududi to promote Islamism among workers in Pakistan. Prof. Shafi Malik became NLF's first president and secretary-general and remained on these positions until 2000.

In 2003, NLF was registered at the National Industrial Relations Commission.

In November 2015, NLF for the first time came together with left-leaning trade unions to condemn plans of the PML-N government to privatise state-owned enterprises.

References

Trade unions established in 1969
Trade unions in Pakistan